is a Japanese voice actress best known for her role as the young Tsubasa Oozora in the soccer anime Captain Tsubasa. Other major roles include Konpoco in Esper Mami, Asa in Project A-Ko, and Shinji in Sonic Soldier Borgman. In Hunter × Hunter (1999) she voiced Feitan, and in Rurouni Kenshin, she voiced Okita Sōji, a major character in the Rurouni Kenshin: Trust & Betrayal OVA. She is married to Yōichi Takahashi, creator of Captain Tsubasa.

Filmography

As Yōko Ogai
 Captain Tsubasa (1983) as Tsubasa Oozora
 Shonen Jump Special: Kimagure Orange Road (1985) as Hikaru Hiyama
 Rurouni Kenshin: Trust & Betrayal (1999, OVA) as Okita Sōji

Unknown date
 Sonic Soldier Borgman as Shinji
 Captain Tsubasa J as Tsubasa Oozora (young)
 Captain Tsubasa: Europe Daikessen (movie 1) as Tsubasa Oozora
 Captain Tsubasa: Road to 2002 as Pinto
 Captain Tsubasa (PS2) as Tsubasa Oozora
 City Hunter as Nana Yoshida
 Doraemon: Nobita and the Dragon Rider (movie) as Little Boy
 Esper Mami as Konpoko
 Esper Mami: Hoshizora no Dancing Doll (movie) as Konpoko
 Langrisser III (VG) as Ferraquia, Ruin
 Langrisser V: The End of Legend (VG) as Ferraquia
 Megazone 23 Part II (OAV) as Cindy
 Mister Ajikko as Takashi Egawa
 Montana Jones as King Mouta
 Project A-Ko (movie) as Asa
 Project A-Ko 2: Plot of the Daitokuji Financial Group (OAV) as Asa
 Project A-ko 3: Cinderella Rhapsody (OAV) as Asa
 Project A-Ko 4: Final (OAV) as Asa
 Ranpou as Miyuki
 Rurouni Kenshin as Okita Sōji
 Shin Captain Tsubasa (OAV) as Tsubasa Ohzora
 The Super Dimension Fortress Macross as Yoshio (eps 2-27)
 Transformers: Masterforce as Cancer
 Wrestler Gundan Seisenshi Robin Jr. as Robin Jr.

As Akari Hibino
Macross 7 (1994) as Billy

Unknown date
Gear Fighter Dendoh as Student
Gyōten Ningen Batseelor as Zenmime
Hungry Heart: Wild Striker as Mori Kazuto
Hunter × Hunter (1999) as Feitan, Menchi
Hunter × Hunter OVA as Feitan
Hunter × Hunter: Greed Island as Feitan
Kiddy Grade as Yott
Magical Circle Guru Guru as Crystal Babaa
Papuwa as G (young); Ifuku
The Legend of Condor Hero as Qiuqian Chi
The Super Dimension Fortress Macross: Do You Remember Love? (movie) as Tewanton 3565
Yu-Gi-Oh! Duel Monsters as Malik's mother
 – Taiga

References

External links
 
TV.com

 Akari Hibino at GamePlaza Haruka Voice Actor Database 
 Youko Ogai, Akari Hibino  at Hitoshi Doi's Seiyuu Database

Japanese voice actresses
Voice actresses from Shizuoka Prefecture
Living people
1959 births
Voice actors from Hamamatsu